The 1998 City of Lincoln Council election took place on 7 May 1998 to elect members of Lincoln District Council in Lincolnshire, England. One third of the council was up for election and the Labour party stayed in overall control of the Council.

After the 1996 election the Labour party held all of the seats on the council but before the 1998 election 7 councillors broke away to sit as Independent Labour councillors.

After the election, the composition of the council was
Labour 28
Independent Labour 3
Conservative 1
Vacant 1

Election result

|-
| colspan=2 style="text-align: right; margin-right: 1em" | Total
| style="text-align: right;" | 11
| colspan=5 |
| style="text-align: right;" | 16,776
| style="text-align: right;" | 

All comparisons in vote share are to the corresponding 1994 election.

Ward results

Abbey

Birchwood

Boultham

Bracebridge

Carholme

Castle

Longdales

Minster

Moorland

Park

Tritton

By-elections between 1998 and 1999

References

1998 English local elections
1998
1990s in Lincolnshire